Church Aston is a village and parish in Shropshire, England. The population of the civil parish at the 2011 census was 1,354.

It is to the south of Newport, though has become merged with the town in recent years due to suburban growth.

Also in the parish is the small village of Longford and part of the hamlet of Cheswell.

Notable residents
Arthur Colegate - Conservative politician, lived at Church Aston Manor at time he was MP for The Wrekin 1940-45.
Iraj Mottahedeh - retired Anglican Bishop in Iran, lives in Church Aston.

See also
Listed buildings in Church Aston

References

External links

Villages in Shropshire
Telford and Wrekin
Newport, Shropshire
Civil parishes in Shropshire